Addis is a town in West Baton Rouge Parish, Louisiana, United States. The population was 3,593 at the 2010 census. It is part of the Baton Rouge Metropolitan Statistical Area.

History
Founded in 1881 or 1882, Addis was originally known Baton Rouge Junction; the community was created as a division point for the Texas and Pacific Railroad. Circa 1909, local citizens renamed the village to Addis to honor J. W. Addis, the railroad official who had convinced the railroad to build a depot, hotel, and other facilities there in 1904.

The Bank of Addis building, listed on the National Register of Historic Places, is located in the town and is now the Addis Museum.

Geography
Addis is located at  (30.354585, -91.264672).

Demographics

As of the 2020 United States census, there were 6,731 people, 1,694 households, and 1,353 families residing in the town.

Government
The current Mayor of Addis is David H. Toups. There are five Council Members. Addis is currently represented in the Louisiana Legislature by Representative Jeremy LaCombe (D-60th District), and Senator Ed Price (D-2nd District). In the U.S. House of Representatives, the town is represented by Rep. Troy Carter (D-New Orleans).

Education
West Baton Rouge Parish School Board operates public schools.

Residents are zoned to Brusly High School.

References

Towns in Louisiana
Louisiana populated places on the Mississippi River
Towns in West Baton Rouge Parish, Louisiana
Towns in Baton Rouge metropolitan area